Junonia hedonia, the brown pansy, chocolate pansy, brown soldier or chocolate argus, is a butterfly found in Southeast Asia, Indonesia, and Australia.

See also
List of butterflies in Taiwan

References

hedonia
Butterflies of Asia
Butterflies of Australia
Butterflies of Singapore
Insects of Southeast Asia
Taxa named by Carl Linnaeus
Butterflies described in 1764